Altenahr is a municipality in the district of Ahrweiler, in Rhineland-Palatinate, Germany. It is the administrative centre for the eponymous collective municipality, to which it belongs. Altenahr is a state-recognised tourist resort and is ranked as a Grundzentrum for state planning purposes.

Geography

Location 
Altenahr is situated on the river Ahr, on the northeastern edge of the Ahr Hills. part of the Eifel mountains, approximately 10 kilometres west of Bad Neuenahr-Ahrweiler and about 35 kilometres southwest of Bonn.

Administrative organisation 
The municipality of Altenahr comprises the following parishes: Altenahr, Altenburg, Kreuzberg and Reimerzhoven.

Neighbouring municipalities 
Altenahr borders on the following neighbouring municipalities, listed clockwise from the north:
Kalenborn, Grafschaft, Mayschoß, Ahrbrück, Lind and Berg.

Climate 
The annual precipitation is 668 mm which is in the middle third of readings collected for Germany as a whole. 34% of weather stations of the German Meteorological Service record lower values. The driest month is February, the greatest amount of rain falls in July; 1.6 times that of February. However, in general the level of precipitation varies little and is evenly distributed over the year. Only 13% of weather stations record lower seasonal variations.

The town was almost entirely submerged during the 2021 European floods.

History 

Altenahr was first mentioned in 893 in the Prüm Urbar.

Incorporations 
On 7 June 1969 the hitherto independent municipality of Kreuzberg, with its 560 inhabitants, was incorporated into Altenahr.

Population growth 
The growth in Altenahr's population related to the present-day municipal area; the values from 1871 to 1987 are based on censuses:

References

Populated places in Ahrweiler (district)